United States of America Gymnastics (USA Gymnastics or USAG) is the national governing body for gymnastics in the United States. Established in 1963 as the U.S. Gymnastics Federation (USGF), USA Gymnastics is responsible for selecting and training national teams for the Olympic Games and World Championships. The mission of USA Gymnastics is to encourage participation and the pursuit of excellence in all aspects of gymnastics.

The programs governed by USAG are:
 Women's artistic gymnastics (WAG)
 Men's artistic gymnastics (MAG)
 Rhythmic gymnastics
 Trampoline & tumbling (T&T)
 Acrobatic gymnastics
 Aerobic gymnastics (designated as discipline of gymnastics by the international body, the FIG)
 Group gymnastics / Gymnastics for All
The Women's Artistic program—comprising the events vault, uneven bars, balance beam, and floor exercise—has become well known through holding several nationally televised competitions each year. Events in the Men's Artistic program include floor exercise, pommel horse, still rings, vault, parallel bars, and horizontal bar.

On November 5, 2018, the United States Olympic Committee (USOC) announced that it was starting the process to decertify USAG as the national governing body for gymnastics at the Olympic level. This followed investigations and prosecutions related to two decades of widespread sexual abuse by coaches, gyms, and other elements overseen by USAG, a scandal first reported in 2016. One month later, USAG filed for bankruptcy.

Women's Artistic programs

Elite Program

The Elite Program consists of regional and national training programs and competitions designed for athletes aspiring to represent the United States in international competition. Athletes participate at Developmental, Open, Pre-Elite, and National Team training camps. Only athletes at the National Team level are called "elite gymnasts". There are two Elite groups: Junior Elite (ages 11–15) and Senior Elite (ages 16+).

In 2016 Valeri Liukin, a former Soviet Olympic medalist and owner of World Olympic Gymnastics Academy, replaced Marta Karolyi as USA Gymnastics women's national team coordinator. Liukin resigned from the position in the aftermath of the USA Gymnastics sex abuse scandal.

Annual elite-level competitions include the American Cup, U.S. Classic, and U.S. Championships, as well as multiple National Qualifying Meets throughout the year. Junior and Senior National Teams are selected based on performance at the U.S. Championships. These athletes then compete at the World Championships. In Olympic years, elite gymnasts compete at the Summer Olympics.

In order to get to the elite level, a gymnast must pass both the elite compulsory and optional qualifiers. In elite compulsory qualifiers, gymnasts compete a basic routine designed by organizers to demonstrate that the gymnast has all the basic skills, including twists, handsprings, jumps, leaps, kips to cast handstand, giants, turns, and more. In elite optionals, the gymnast is evaluated for advanced skills and moves, such as pak saltos, releases, complex dismounts, multiple tucks/twists, double layouts, twisting vaults, and more.  In optionals, gymnasts create their own routines.

Talent Opportunity Program

The Talent Opportunity Program (TOPs) seeks to identify talented female gymnasts aged 7–10 for further training up to the elite level. State and regional evaluations are followed by a national test of physical abilities and basic gymnastics skills in October of each year. This is followed by a national training camp in December for those who qualify.

Olympics Hopefuls program

The Olympics Hopefuls program (HOPEs) is a program to identify talented gymnasts, generally aged 11-14, and train them to an advanced level. In order to qualify for HOPEs, a gymnast must pass both the elite compulsory and optional qualifiers, and get a certain minimum score.  HOPEs Elite gymnasts compete at elite meets, but not as a Junior Elite.

Women's Development Program

The Women's Development Program (previously the Junior Olympic program) provides training, evaluation, and competition opportunities to allow developing gymnasts to safely advance at their own pace through specific skill levels. Most competitive gymnasts advance through this system.

 As of August 1, 2013, the levels are as follows.
 Developmental levels 1–2: the most fundamental skills performed in a non-competitive, achievement-oriented environment
 Compulsory levels 3–5: progressively difficult skills performed competitively as standardized routines (all gymnasts at a given level perform the same routines)
 Optional levels 6–10: progressively difficult skills performed competitively in original routines

Skills are grouped by degree of difficulty and given the letter ratings A–E, with A denoting the easiest skills. Levels 6–8 have difficulty restrictions, in that a gymnast competing at one of these levels may not attempt skills above a certain level of difficulty (for example, level 6 and 7 gymnasts may only include A and B skills in their routines). Levels 9 and 10 have no such difficulty restrictions, although level 9 gymnasts may include only one D or E skill in any single routine.

In addition to demonstrating the necessary skills, gymnasts must reach a minimum age to advance to the next level. For example, level 8 and 9 gymnasts must be at least 8 years old; level 10 gymnasts must be at least 9 years old. Regardless of age, all beginning gymnasts enter the program at level 1 and may advance through more than one level per year. Competitions for gymnasts at level 7 culminate in State Championships, level 8 at Regional Championships, level 9 at Eastern or Western Championships, and level 10 at Junior Olympic National Championships.

Prior to August 1, 2013, the developmental levels were numbered 1–4, the compulsory levels 5–6, and the optional levels 7–10. The old levels 1 and 2 have been combined into the new level 1; level 7 has been split into the new levels 6 and 7; and the numbering of levels 3–6 have each been shifted down one level for the new system.

Xcel Program

The Xcel Program provides training and competition experience for gymnasts outside of the traditional Junior Olympic program. Its stated purpose is "to provide gymnasts of varying abilities and commitment levels, the opportunity for a rewarding gymnastics experience." Participants compete in individual and team competitions in Bronze, Silver, Gold, Platinum, and Diamond divisions, based on age and ability level.

National teams 
 United States women's national gymnastics team – Founded in 1982
 United States men's national gymnastics team – Founded in 1998

Sex abuse of gymnasts 

In 2018, Larry Nassar, who was the national team doctor through four Olympic cycles, pleaded guilty to sexually abusing over 300 female athletes, including Olympic gold medalists Aly Raisman and Jordyn Wieber. Following his sentencing, the United States Olympic Committee (USOC) threatened to decertify USA Gymnastics unless the entire board resigned. USA Gymnastics complied and all 21 board members resigned on January 26. Olympic medalist McKayla Maroney has filed a lawsuit alleging that USA Gymnastics paid her to keep silent about Nassar's abuse. Gymnasts have called for those who protected Nassar, including the USOC and USA Gymnastics, to be held accountable for their actions.

In 2016, a former federal prosecutor was commissioned by USA Gymnastics to develop recommendations to reform its policies related to sexual misconduct; her report included 70 recommendations. Among these was removing the "athlete representative" from the Olympic selection committee so athletes would be less afraid to report abuses.

USA Gymnastics cut ties with the Karolyi Ranch in the wake of the scandal, after several gymnasts said they had been abused by Nassar on the premises. The ranch, operated by Béla Károlyi and his wife, former national team coordinator Márta Károlyi, had been the official US Women's National Team Training Center since 2001.

On November 5, 2018, the USOC announced that it was starting the process to decertify USAG as the national governing body for gymnastics in the United States.  One month later, USA Gymnastics filed for bankruptcy.

On October 31, 2020, United States President, Donald Trump, signed the Empowering Olympic, Paralympic and Amateur Athletes Act into law. First introduced in the United States Senate on July 30, 2019 by Kansas Republican Senator, Jerry Moran, and co-sponsored by Connecticut Democratic Senator, Richard Blumenthal, the bill received bipartisan support and unanimously passed in the United States House of Representatives on October 29, 2020. Under the new bill, athletes gained greater protection from abuse, including sexual abuse, by coaches and employees in U.S. Olympic and Paralympic sports in addition to greater representation in decision-making roles. In the wake of the Larry Nassar revelations, in 2019 the United States Olympic & Paralympic Committee (USOPC) increased funding for the United States Center for SafeSport from $4.5 million to $7.5 million and began working on reform to fill at least half of seats on USOPC boards and committees with current and former athletes, including National Governing Bodies (NGB's) for individual sports such as USA Gymnastics and USA Swimming, create better oversight of affiliated sports organizations, make it easier for athletes to report concerns, and provide greater budget transparency. The Empowering Olympic, Paralympic and Amateur Athletes Act increased federation funding for the U.S. Center for SafeSport to $20 million, gave USOPC exclusive authority to respond to sexual abuse and sexual allegations of misconduct within the USOPC and NGB's, established a bipartisan committee to do a complete review of the USOPC and empowered the United States Congress to dissolve the USOPC and decertify NGB's if they fail to follow through on reform. Upon signature, Senator Moran and Senator Blumenthal issued a joint statement crediting survivors, colleagues and athlete advocates that traveled to Washington to share their stories and demand change for making it possible.

On February 25, 2021, the state of Michigan charged former USA Gymnastics coach John Geddert with 24 felonies including human trafficking and forced labor, first degree sexual assault, second degree sexual assault, racketeering and lying to police. Geddert was the US National team coach at the 2012 London Olympics and was closely affiliated with convicted abuser Larry Nassar. Geddert died by suicide the same day.

Also in 2021, the United States Center for SafeSport temporarily suspended Jean-Luc Cairon from all contact with athletes, and USA Gymnastics member clubs and members while it conducts an investigation of claims against him, and he was entered into the SafeSport Centralized Disciplinary Database for allegations of misconduct.

See also
 Fédération Internationale de Gymnastique – International governing body
 Artistic gymnastics in the United States
 List of gymnastics academies in the United States

References

External links
 

National members of the PanAmerican Gymnastic Union
Gymnastics
Sports organizations established in 1963
Gymnastics in the United States
Companies that filed for Chapter 11 bankruptcy in 2018
Non-profit organizations based in Indianapolis